Christopher Ender Carrabba (born April 10, 1975) is the lead singer and guitarist of the band Dashboard Confessional, lead singer of the band Further Seems Forever, and is the vocalist for the folk band Twin Forks.

Early life and education
Born in West Hartford, Connecticut, United States, Carrabba's parents divorced when he was three. At age 16, he moved with his mother Anne, brother Nick, stepbrother and stepfather to Boca Raton, Florida. Carrabba remains close to some relatives on his paternal side, but is not close to his father Andrew specifically.

As a teenager, Carrabba was interested in skateboarding and passionate about music. In high school, he started singing in his choir. At 15, his two cousins found a guitar in their basement, presumably belonging to their father but the true owner is unknown. Carrabba ended up with the guitar when one of them figured he would be the only one who could play it. After graduating from Boca Raton Community High School, Carrabba became more serious about music and joined his first band, The Vacant Andys, and matriculated to Florida Atlantic University to study education.

At college, alongside studies, Carrabba played with The Vacant Andys and, later, with The Agency, which featured Chris Carrabba on their second LP, ENGINES.  This was the first recording to feature both Mike Marsh and Chris Carrabba before Mike Marsh became Dashboard Confessional's full-time drummer. For several years, Chris taught at an elementary school in South Florida and played with the group Further Seems Forever.

Dashboard Confessional was born when Chris recorded the Drowning EP with Fiddler Records. "I started (Dashboard) as a side project from the band I was in," says Carrabba. "I was going through something really tough at the time and since I don't write in a journal, this is what I did with it. It was a good way to get it out of my system. I never thought anyone would hear these songs, but I played some for my friends and one of them who owned a little label talked me into recording." The name Dashboard Confessional comes from the song "The Sharp Hint of New Tears." The lyric "On the way home, this car hears my confessions" brought to mind the phrase "Dashboard Confessional."

Carrabba was a special education teacher prior to his success with Dashboard Confessional, often keeping a guitar in his office to write songs during downtime.

Personal life
In 2008, just as he was wrapping up work on the sixth Dashboard Confessional album, Carrabba's sister was in a serious car accident that put her in a coma for several months. "I was torn between being with her through most of her waking hours until we were kicked out of the hospital at the end of their shifts and going home and doing my work," he said.

Carrabba required double shoulder surgeries following a motorcycle accident in 2020.

Career

Carrabba started his career with the Vacant Andys. In 1998, while playing with the Vacant Andys, he filled in on guitar in New Found Glory, when regular guitarist Chad Gilbert was on tour with his other band, Shai Hulud. In 2001, he joined the band Further Seems Forever for their debut album The Moon is Down, before moving on to found Dashboard Confessional. In 2002, Dashboard Confessional won the MTV2 Award at MTV Music Awards for the video for "Screaming Infidelities." The video was considered the "dark horse" nominee at the time, as it was up against The Strokes, The Hives, Norah Jones, Nappy Roots, and Musiq. The video was directed by Maureen Egan and Matthew Barry.

Reuniting with Further Seems Forever
It was announced on August 24, 2010, that Further Seems Forever would be reuniting with original vocalist Chris Carrabba with the release of a teaser video featuring rehearsal footage of the song "The Moon Is Down."

Covered in the Flood
In November 2011, Carrabba released an album of covers entitled Covered in the Flood exclusively on his solo US tour. The album contains 10 tracks originally performed by artists that include R.E.M., Big Star, Guy Clark, Justin Townes Earle and The Replacements.

Guest appearances
Carrabba appears on the Hot Rod Circuit song "Unfaithful."
Carrabba provides backing vocals on the Say Anything song "Retarded in Love," on the Twothirtyeight album Regulate the Chemicals, and on the New Found Glory cover of the song "The Promise", which is featured on the album From the Screen to Your Stereo Part II.
Carrabba also appears in Notar's song "Reach."
Carrabba appears in nothing,nowhere.'s song "Hopes Up", featured on the album REAPER.
Carrabba is featured on a version of the band Neck Deep's hit single "December."
Carrabba was a special guest DJ at Emo Nite LA's 2nd anniversary party.

References

External links

 

1975 births
American male singer-songwriters
American rock guitarists
American male guitarists
American rock singers
American rock songwriters
Dashboard Confessional members
Florida Atlantic University alumni
Further Seems Forever members
Living people
Singer-songwriters from Florida
People from Boca Raton, Florida
People from West Hartford, Connecticut
Guitarists from Connecticut
Guitarists from Florida
21st-century American singers
Singer-songwriters from Connecticut
Boca Raton Community High School alumni